Madeley is a village and ward in the Borough of Newcastle-under-Lyme, North Staffordshire, England. It is split into three parts: Madeley, Middle Madeley, and Little Madeley.  Madeley Heath is also considered by many to be part of Madeley.  In the 2001 census, the population was recorded as 4,386, decreasing to 4,222 at the 2011 Census.

Geography
To the north are the villages of Betley and Wrinehill. South is the hamlet of Baldwin's Gate. To the east is Keele, the site of Keele University as well as Silverdale, whilst to the west lies Onneley and Woore.

History
Madeley is derived from the Saxon, Madanlieg, meaning 'a clearing in the woods belonging to Mada' (Mada is a female Saxon name).

Madeley is recorded in the Domesday Book of 1086 as being  of wood, with 4 plough teams. The first Madeley Old Manor was built by Robert de Stafford, with the local church being founded in 1200.
Heighley Castle was built in 1226 by Henry de Audley and ordered to be demolished by a Parliamentary committee sitting at Stafford in 1644 to prevent its use by Royalists. Little remains today but some of the ruins are still visible during winter through the vegetation surrounding the area.

Madeley Old Hall is a timber-framed Elizabethan house and now a country house hotel. It is a Grade II* listed building.

Industry
A significant feature and well-known landmark of the village is Madeley Mill standing on the dam for the pool. During its history the mill was used for grinding grain but prior to its closure, production was turned over to cheese making. It fell into disrepair before being developed and converted into apartments in the early 1990s saving it from proposed demolition by the local council.

There was a butchers shop opposite the pool that was run by Arthur Bailey.

North Staffordshire was a centre for coal mining and the nearby mine at Leycett was known as Madeley under the National Coal Board. Sinking began in the 1880s and the colliery had five shafts with exotic names: Bang Up, Fair Lady, Clarkes, Harrisons and Woodburn. The pit closed on 21 September 1957. There is nothing left of the site nowadays, it being subject to open cast mining that removed the remaining coal and the slag heaps.It is used for agriculture.

Madeley has a shopping parade.

Education
Meadows Primary School, Sir John Offley Primary School and Madeley High School all serve the surrounding area.

As part of the expansion in higher and further education, Madeley College opened in 1962 and specialised in Men's Physical Education and Home Economics. It closed in the mid-1980s after becoming part of the North Staffordshire Polytechnic.

Transport

Roads
The majority of the settlement sits between the M6 motorway and the West Coast Main Line but there is no access to the motorway or a railway station. The A525 road passes through Madeley as a primary route. It connects with the A531 which further connects with the A500 to the north.

Railways

Madeley was served by two railway stations, with the station on the West Coast Main Line closing in 1954. It was previously a stabling point for the Royal Train. There was also a Madeley Road station on the North Staffordshire Railway's branch line to Market Drayton which was opened on 1 February 1870 and closed in 1931. However, during the 1960s the Station at Madeley Road was reopened and used as a messroom by British Rail Traincrew and Shunters for running Round Coal Trains destined for Silverdale and Holditch Collieries. These Trains came off the West Coast Mainline and onto the former Branch via Madeley Chord. This arrangement continued until Silverdale Colliery closed in 1998.

Notable people 

 James Tuchet, 5th Baron Audley (c. 1398–1459) born in Heleigh Castle was an English peer.
 Joseph Elkington (1740-1806) English agriculturalist, lauded by parliament for his reforms to land drainage. Elkington moved to Hey House in Staffordshire in 1797 to farm 500 acres of land at Madeley which became known as Bog Farm.
 William Bridges Adams (1797–1872) author, inventor and locomotive engineer. He is best known for his patented Adams axle 
 Gordon Banks (1937–2019) 1966 World Cup England national team goalkeeper lived in the village.
 Ian Fraser Kilmister (1945–2015), better known as Lemmy, singer/songwriter from Motörhead 
 Paul Goodwin (born 1978) English minor counties cricketer, right-handed batsman and wicket-keeper.
Louis Moult (born 1992) English professional footballer, plays for Burton Albion
 Nathan Smith (born 1996) English professional footballer, plays for Port Vale F.C.

See also
Listed buildings in Madeley, Staffordshire

References

External links

Madeley on the Web
Map References
Little Madeley 
Madeley Heath 
Middle Madeley 

Villages in Staffordshire
Borough of Newcastle-under-Lyme